is a Shinto-based Shinshūkyō (Japanese new religion) founded in 1947. It was founded by Rikihisa Tatsusai as Tenchi Kōdō Zenrinkai, and is headquartered in Fukuoka Prefecture. Zenrinkyō was registered as a legal religious corporation under the Shūkyō Hōjinrei ordinance in 1948. In 2005 the group had a claimed nominal membership of 450,000 under leader Rikihisa Ryūseki.

References

External links
 

Japanese new religions
Religious organizations based in Japan
New religious movements
Religious corporations
Shinto new religious movements